Twenty Years of African Cinema is a 1983 Tunisian documentary film directed by Férid Boughedir, which looks back at 20 years of African cinema. It was screened in the Un Certain Regard section at the 1983 Cannes Film Festival. In April 2019, a restored version of the film was selected to be shown in the Cannes Classics section at the 2019 Cannes Film Festival.

References

External links

1983 films
1980s French-language films
Documentary films about African cinema
Films directed by Férid Boughedir
1983 independent films
1983 documentary films
Tunisian documentary films